A certificate of relief from disabilities is issued by a state of the United States of America to a person who has committed a felony or misdemeanor but has subsequently shown that he or she has been rehabilitated.  The closely related "certificate of good conduct" is given to a person who has committed two or more felonies and has demonstrated rehabilitation. Potential employers or licensing authorities must consider these certificates as evidence that the person is rehabilitated: if a person has such a certificate, the fact that they were convicted cannot be used as a reason to deny them employment or the granting of a license. Not all states offer such certificates.

References

Penal system in the United States
Legal documents